Daniel Didavi (born 21 February 1990) is a German professional footballer.

Club career
Didavi started his career with SpV 05 Nürtingen. He was scouted in summer 2003 by VfB Stuttgart, and he was promoted to the first team in July 2009.

In July 2011, he was loaned out to 1. FC Nürnberg until the end of the season, where he became known as a midfielder with an eye for the goal, scoring 8 goals in the second half of the season.

On 2 July 2012, Didavi extended his contract with VfB Stuttgart until June 2016. In the years 2012 to 2015 Didavi was repeatedly thrown back by injuries. However, he would support his team crucially in the relegation battles of the closing stages of the Bundesliga seasons 2013–14 and 2014–15.

On 5 April 2016, VfL Wolfsburg announced the signing of Didavi on a contract until 2021, at the end of the 2015–16 Bundesliga campaign.

On 29 June 2018, Didavi signed a three-year contract with VfB Stuttgart, enabling him to return to his former club on 1 July 2018.

He was released upon his contract expiry in 2022.

International career
Didavi was a member of the German youth national teams at the U18, U19, U20 and U21 levels.

Personal life
Didavi's mother is German, while his father is from Benin.

Career statistics

Honours

VfB Stuttgart
 DFB-Pokal runner-up: 2012–13

References

External links
 
 

1990 births
Living people
People from Nürtingen
Sportspeople from Stuttgart (region)
German people of Beninese descent
German footballers
Footballers from Baden-Württemberg
Association football midfielders
Germany youth international footballers
Germany under-21 international footballers
Bundesliga players
2. Bundesliga players
3. Liga players
Regionalliga players
VfB Stuttgart players
VfB Stuttgart II players
1. FC Nürnberg II players
1. FC Nürnberg players
VfL Wolfsburg players